Johann I may refer to:

 Johann I Josef, Prince of Liechtenstein (1760–1836)
Johann I, Duke of Opava-Ratibor
Johann I, Count Palatine of Simmern
Johann I, Count Palatine of Zweibrücken
John, Elector of Saxony (1468–1532), John the Steadfast
Johann, Count of Cleves
Johann, Count of Coronini-Cronberg
Johann, Count of Pálffy
Johann, Count von Aldringer
Johann, Count von Werth
Johann, Elector of Brandenburg
Johann Strauss I
Johann, Baron von Appel
Johann I, Count of Habsburg-Laufenburg-Rapperswil (* around 1295/97, † 1337)

See also
John I (disambiguation)